Gwen Berrou is a Belgian actress. She is best known for playing Marth in Bouli Lanners drama The Giants (2011). For her role, she received a Magritte Award for Best Supporting Actress.

Selected filmography
 Henri, directed by Yolande Moreau (2013)

External links
 

Living people
Year of birth missing (living people)
Belgian film actresses
Magritte Award winners
21st-century Belgian actresses
Place of birth missing (living people)